Line 2 of Changzhou Metro is a rapid transit line in Changzhou.

Construction for Line 2 began on 13 February 2017. Line 2 opened on 28 June 2021.

Route
It follows Xinggang Road from Qingfeng Park to Wuxing. It then continues under Qinye Road until Qinye, then turns onto Laodong West Road, approaching Huaide. At Nandajie, the line veers under Yanling West Road, interchanging with Line 1 at Cultural Palace, turning onto Feilong East Road at Hongmei Park. At Sanjiaochang, it again turns onto Dongfang Avenue, where it continues until Wuyi Lu.

It is in Zhonglou District from Qingfeng Park to Nandajie. It is in Tianning District from Cultural Palace to Ziyun. It is in Wujin District from Qingyang Road to Wuyi Lu.

Opening timeline

Stations

References

Rail transport in Jiangsu
Railway lines opened in 2021
2
2021 establishments in China